John Longland (1473 – 7 May 1547) was the English Dean of Salisbury from 1514 to 1521 and Bishop of Lincoln from 1521 to his death in 1547.

Career
He was made a Demy at Magdalen College, Oxford in 1491 and became a Fellow. He was King Henry VIII's confessor and was said to have been one of those who first persuaded the King that he should annul his marriage to Catherine of Aragon.

In 1519 he was appointed Canon of the sixth stall at St George's Chapel, Windsor Castle, a position he held until 1520. He was also Lord Almoner from c.1521. He was consecrated a bishop on 5 May 1521, by William Warham, Archbishop of Canterbury, assisted by John Fisher, Bishop of Rochester; Nicholas West, Bishop of Ely; and John Vesey, Bishop of Exeter.

During the English Reformation, he was among the conservative bishops, recognizing Transubstantiation. His conservatism is attested to by his complaint in 1536 to Thomas Cromwell about Protestant preachers in his diocese.

See also
Lollardy, a reform movement investigated by Longland
Agnes Ashford, an evangelist censured by Longland
List of chancellors of the University of Oxford

References

 
 
 
 

Deans of Salisbury
Bishops of Lincoln
16th-century English bishops
Chancellors of the University of Oxford
1473 births
1547 deaths
Canons of Windsor
People from Oxfordshire (before 1974)